The women's 400 metres sprint competition of the athletics events at the 2011 Pan American Games will take place between the 24 and 26 of October at the Telmex Athletics Stadium. The defending Pan American Games champion is Ana Guevara of Mexico, who has since retired.

Records
Prior to this competition, the existing world and Pan American Games records were as follows:

Qualification
Each National Olympic Committee (NOC) was able to enter up to two entrants providing they had met the minimum standard (53.00) in the qualifying period (January 1, 2010 to September 14, 2011).

Schedule

Results
All times shown are in seconds.

Semifinals
The semifinals were held on October 25.  The top three in each heat (Q) and the next two fastest (q) qualified for the final.

Final
The final was held on October 26.

References

Athletics at the 2011 Pan American Games
2011
2011 in women's athletics